Alto Palancia (Valencian: Alt Palància) is a comarca in the province of Castellón, Valencian Community (Spain). It is part of the Spanish-speaking area in the Valencian Community.

Municipalities 
The comarca is composed of 27 municipalities, listed below with their populations at the 2001 and 2011 Censuses, and according to the most recent official estimates (for 1 January 2019):

References

 
Comarques of the Valencian Community
Geography of the Province of Castellón